Idalus is a genus of moths in the family Erebidae. The genus was erected by Francis Walker in 1855.

Species

Idalus admirabilis (Cramer, [1777])
Idalus affinis Rothschild, 1917
Idalus agastus Dyar, 1910
Idalus agricus Dyar, 1910
Idalus albescens (Rothschild, 1909)
Idalus albidior Rothschild, 1917
Idalus aleteria (Schaus, 1905)
Idalus aletis (Schaus, 1910)
Idalus bicolorella (Strand, 1919)
Idalus brachystriata (Dognin, 1912)
Idalus carinosa (Schaus, 1905)
Idalus citrina Druce, 1890
Idalus crinis Druce, 1884
Idalus critheis Druce, 1884
Idalus daga (Dognin, 1891)
Idalus dares Druce, 1894
Idalus decisa (Rothschild, 1917)
Idalus delicata Möschler, 1886
Idalus dilucida (Rothschild, 1910)
Idalus dognini (Rothschild, 1910)
Idalus dorsalis (Seitz, 1921)
Idalus erythronota (Herrich-Schäffer, [1853])
Idalus fasciipuncta (Rothschild, 1909)
Idalus felderi (Rothschild, 1909)
Idalus flavibrunnea Dognin, 1906
Idalus flavicostalis (Rothschild, 1935)
Idalus herois Schaus, 1889
Idalus idalia (Hampson, 1901)
Idalus intermedia (Rothschild, 1909)
Idalus iragorri (Dognin, 1902)
Idalus irrupta (Schaus, 1905)
Idalus lineosus Walker, 1869
Idalus lucens (Druce, 1901)
Idalus luteorosea (Rothschild, 1909)
Idalus lutescens Rothschild, 1909
Idalus maesi Laguerre, 2006
Idalus metacrinis (Rothschild, 1909)
Idalus monostidza (Hampson, 1916)
Idalus multicolor (Rothschild, 1909)
Idalus nigropunctata (Rothschild, 1909)
Idalus noiva (E. D. Jones, 1914)
Idalus ochracea (Rothschild, 1909)
Idalus ochreata (Schaus, 1905)
Idalus ortus Schaus, 1892
Idalus panamensis Schaus, 1921
Idalus paulae Espinoza, 2013
Idalus perlineosa (Rothschild, 1917)
Idalus pichesensis Dyar, 1898
Idalus quadratus Rothschild, 1933
Idalus sublineata (Rothschild, 1917)
Idalus tenuifascia (Dognin, 1911)
Idalus tuisana (Schaus, 1910)
Idalus tumara Schaus, 1921
Idalus tybris (Cramer, [1776])
Idalus veneta Dognin, 1901
Idalus vitrea (Cramer, [1780])
Idalus vitreoides (Rothschild, 1922)

References

 
Moth genera
Phaegopterina